The 1991 Troy State Trojans football team represented Troy State University (now known as Troy University) as an independent during the 1991 NCAA Division II football season. Led by first-year head coach Larry Blakeney, the Trojans compiled an overall record of 5–6.

Schedule

References

Troy State
Troy Trojans football seasons
Troy State Trojans football